Sir Thomas Wyatt the Younger Wyatt’s Rebellion 

This is a list of people convicted of high treason in the Kingdom of England before the Union with Scotland on 1 May 1707. It does not include people convicted of petty treason.

Chronological list
1283 
Dafydd ap Gruffydd, Prince of Wales
1305
William Wallace
1381
John Ball
1405
Richard le Scrope, Archbishop of York
1478
 George Plantagenet, 1st Duke of Clarence, for plotting against King Edward IV of England in 1478
1495
Sir William Stanley
1499
Edward Plantagenet, 17th Earl of Warwick
Perkin Warbeck
1521
Edward Stafford, 3rd Duke of Buckingham
1535
Thomas More, Lord Chancellor
1536 - Anne Boleyn, Kildare Rebellion, etc.
Anne Boleyn, Queen
George Boleyn, 2nd Viscount Rochford
Sir William Brereton
Sir Henry Norris
Archdeacon Charles Reynolds
Mark Smeaton
Silken Thomas
Sir Francis Weston

1537 - Pilgrimage of Grace
Sir Robert Aske
1541 - Catherine Howard, etc.
Catherine Howard, Queen
Thomas Culpeper
Francis Dereham
1549 - Kett's Rebellion
Persons convicted for their involvement in Kett's Rebellion:
Robert Kett
1553
Jane Grey, etc.
John Dudley, 1st Duke of Northumberland
Lady Jane Grey
1554 - Wyatt's Rebellion
William Thomas
Henry Grey, 1st Duke of Suffolk
1572 - Ridolfi plot
See Ridolfi plot:
Thomas Howard, 4th Duke of Norfolk
1586 - Babington plot
Fourteen individuals were executed for their involvement in the Babington plot. Persons convicted include:
Sir Anthony Babington
Mary, Queen of Scots
Chidiock Tichborne
1601 - Essex Rebellion
Robert Devereux, 2nd Earl of Essex
Henry Wriothesley, 3rd Earl of Southampton

1603 - Main plot

Persons convicted for their involvement in the Main Plot include:
Henry Brooke, 11th Baron Cobham
Thomas Grey, 15th Baron Grey de Wilton
Sir Walter Raleigh, executed 1618

1605 - Gunpowder plot
 Robert Catesby, John Wright, Thomas Wintour, Thomas Percy, Guy Fawkes, Robert Keyes, Thomas Bates, Robert Wintour, Christopher Wright, John Grant, Ambrose Rookwood, Sir Everard Digby and Francis Tresham, for the Gunpowder Plot

1649
Charles I, King of England, Scotland and Ireland

Regicides of Charles I

See List of regicides of Charles I

Tonge plot

1680 - Popish Plot

Persons implicated in the alleged Popish Plot:
William Howard, 1st Viscount Stafford

1683 - Rye House Plot

Those convicted in relation to the Rye House Plot include:
William Russell, Lord Russell
Elizabeth Gaunt

Alphabetical list

A

B
Anthony Babington (1586) (Babington Plot)
Anne Boleyn, Queen (1536)
George Boleyn, Viscount Rochford (1536)
Sir William Brereton (1536)
Henry Brooke, 11th Baron Cobham (1603) (Main Plot)

C
Charles I, King of England, Scotland and Ireland (1649)
Thomas Culpeper (1541)

D
Francis Dereham (1541)
Robert Devereux, 2nd Earl of Essex (1601) (Essex Rebellion)
John Dudley, 1st Duke of Northumberland (1553)

E

F
Guy Fawkes (1605) (Gunpowder Plot)

G
Elizabeth Gaunt (1685) (Rye House Plot)
Henry Grey, 1st Duke of Suffolk (1554) (Wyatt's Rebellion)
Lady Jane Grey
Thomas Grey, 15th Baron Grey de Wilton (1603) (Main Plot)
Dafydd ap Gruffydd, Prince of Wales (1283)

H
Catherine Howard, Queen (1541)
Thomas Howard, 4th Duke of Norfolk (1572) (Ridolfi plot)
William Howard, 1st Viscount Stafford (1680) (Popish Plot)

I

J

K
Robert Kett (1549) (Kett's Rebellion/Norfolk rebellion)

L

M
Thomas More, Lord Chancellor (1535)

N
Sir Henry Norris (1536)

O

P
Edward Plantagenet, 17th Earl of Warwick (1499)

Q

R
Sir Walter Raleigh (1603, executed 1618) (Main Plot)
William Russell, Lord Russell (1683) (Rye House Plot)

S
Mark Smeaton (1536)
Edward Stafford, 3rd Duke of Buckingham (1521)
Sir William Stanley (1495)
Mary Stuart, Queen of Scots (1586) (Babington Plot)

T
William Thomas (1554) (Wyatt's rebellion)
Chidiock Tichborne (1586) (Babington Plot)

W
William Wallace (1305)
Perkin Warbeck (1499)
Sir Francis Weston (1536)
Thomas Wintour or Winter (1605) (Gunpowder Plot)
Henry Wriothesley, 3rd Earl of Southampton (1601) (Essex Rebellion)

See also
List of trials of peers in the House of Lords

References

 
High treason in England before 1 May 1707
High treason in England before 1 May 1707